Stephen McKinley Henderson (born August 31, 1949) is an American actor and director. Henderson trained at Juilliard School for acting and later became a resident member of the Repertory Theatre of St. Louis from 1976 to 1981. He came to prominence as a character actor often performing the plays of August Wilson. He's received nominations for a Tony Award, a Drama Desk Award, and two Screen Actors Guild Awards. Vulture Magazine named Henderson as one of "The 32 Greatest Character Actors Working Today". 

Henderson made his Broadway debut in Wilson's King Hedley II in 2001. He later earned a nomination for the Tony Award for Best Featured Actor in a Play for Wilson's Fences in 2010. He has since starred in A Raisin in the Sun in 2014 and Between Riverside and Crazy in 2022. He made his film debut in the 1979 film A Pleasure Doing Business. He has since appeared in Extremely Loud & Incredibly Close (2011), Lincoln (2012), Fences (2015), Manchester by the Sea (2016), Lady Bird (2017), Dune (2021), and Causeway (2022). 

His television debut came in 1984 appearing in PBS's The Killing Floor. He's since appeared in Law & Order (1995–2010), Law and Order: Special Victims Unit (2005–2006), The Newsroom (2013), The Blacklist (2018), Wu-Tang: An American Saga (2019–2020), and Devs (2020).

Early life and education
Henderson was born in Kansas City, Missouri, the son of Ruby Naomi and Elihue Henderson. He spent a year at Lincoln University, Missouri and was originally part of Group 1 at the Juilliard School Drama Division before he left. He finished his BFA in Acting at the North Carolina School of the Arts (1972). He later studied at Purdue University where he received his Master of Arts in Theatre (1977). He also spent summer sessions at Rose Bruford College in London and William Esper Studios in New York City.

In 2020, Henderson was selected to return to his alma mater, Purdue University, to participate in the "Old Masters Program", an Old Master being a person who has made significant contributions to their field of study and to society. Due to the COVID-19 pandemic, Henderson's visit was virtual, where he engaged with the Purdue community through an array of interactive platforms including the Old Masters Podcast, personal host calls, virtual classroom talks, and events with student organizations in which he talked about his career and success. 2020 marked the 70th year of the Old Master's program, and was the first hybrid version, with Henderson broadcasting his appearances from his home. When asked by a Purdue Theatre student what advice he would give to current students, Henderson replied "Undergraduates should read broadly. Graduate students should read deeply."

Career
Henderson is known mostly for his stage work. He won the 2015 Obie Award for Best Actor for his starring role of Walter "Pops" Washington in the Atlantic Theatre Company and Second Stage productions of the Pulitzer Prize-winning play Between Riverside and Crazy. He portrayed Jim Bono in the Broadway revival of August Wilson's Fences, starring Denzel Washington, for which Henderson received a nomination for a Tony Award as a supporting actor, as well as the Richard Seff Award from Actor's Equity; he reprised the role in Washington's 2016 film adaptation. Also in 2016, Henderson appeared in Kenneth Lonergan's Manchester by the Sea, starring Casey Affleck and Michelle Williams, playing the boss of Affleck's character. Previously, he appeared as Van Helsing in the Broadway production of Dracula, the Musical. More recently, he played the role of Father Leviatch in Greta Gerwig's 2017 film Lady Bird. On Broadway, he has performed in Drowning Crow, the revival of Ma Rainey's Black Bottom, and the premiere of King Hedley II. Henderson is recognized as a veteran performer of August Wilson's oeuvre.

His signature August Wilson role is the gossipy Turnbo in Jitney for which he won a Drama Desk Award. He had created the role in the 1996 premiere at the Pittsburgh Public Theater, then honed it (as Wilson was honing the script) in other regional theaters before its arrival Off-Broadway in 2000. Though they did not transfer to Broadway, he and the core of the cast took Jitney to London where it won the 2002 Olivier Award for best new play. In addition, he appeared in A Raisin in the Sun and directed Zooman and the Sign. With the LAByrinth Theatre Company, he portrayed Pontius Pilate in The Last Days of Judas Iscariot.

His films include his role as Arthur in Everyday People, White House servant William Slade in Steven Spielberg's film Lincoln (2012), Lester in the film Tower Heist (2011), Bobo in A Raisin in the Sun (1989), Cooper's husband in the TV movie Marie (1985), and roles in the films Keane (2004), If You Could Say It in Words (2008), Lady Bird (2017) and Dune (2021). In addition to his films, Henderson was a series regular on the FOX series New Amsterdam, which premiered in early 2008.

His television work includes Law & Order, Law & Order: Special Victims Unit, The Newsroom, Law & Order: Criminal Intent, Tyler Perry's House of Payne, Third Watch, New Amsterdam, Blue Bloods and Devs.

Filmography

Film

Television

Theatre

Awards and nominations

References

External links
 
 
 

1949 births
Living people
African-American male actors
Juilliard School alumni
University at Buffalo faculty
Purdue University alumni
University of North Carolina School of the Arts alumni
American male film actors
American male television actors
American male stage actors
Male actors from Kansas City, Missouri
20th-century American male actors
21st-century American male actors
Alumni of Rose Bruford College
20th-century African-American people
21st-century African-American people